Fu River, or Fujiang is a river of in China's Sichuan Province and Chongqing Municipality. It is a right tributary of the Jialing River, which in its turn is a left tributary of the Yangtze; it is thus part of the East China Sea basin.

The Fujiang flows in the general southern and south-eastern direction across the central Sichuan (Mianyang and Suining Prefectures), and then enters the Chongqing Municipality, where it merges with the Jialing.

See also
List of rivers in China

Rivers of Sichuan
Tributaries of the Yangtze River